Phemeranthus calycinus, commonly called largeflower fameflower, rock pink, or fame flower is a species of flowering plant in the montia family (Montiaceae). It is native to the central United States, and its natural habitat is on glades, sandy areas, or bluffs with rock outcrops.

Description
Phemeranthus calycinus is an herbaceous perennial, typically growing in large colonies. Pink-red to red-purple flowers are arranged in open groups at the end of the flower stalks. The flowers, which only open for a couple of hours in the early afternoon, have 5 to 8 rounded petals, 2 sepals, 30 to 45 stamens, and a pistil with a thin style.

Taxonomy
A synonymous name for Phemeranthus calycinus is Talinum calycinum.

Etymology
The Latin specific epithet calycinus means calyx-like.

Distribution and habitat
It is native to New Mexico, Colorado, Texas, Oklahoma, Kansas, Nebraska, Louisiana, Arkansas, Missouri, and Illinois. It is listed as endangered in  Illinois and critically imperiled/imperiled in Nebraska. It is found primarily in the areas of the Great Plains and Ozark and Ouachita Mountains in the United States. Its natural habitat is on glades, sandy areas, or bluffs with rock outcrops, typically on acidic substrates (although rare populations on calcareous substrates are known).

References

Montiaceae
Flora of North America